VPI may refer to:

 Vietnam Petroleum Institute
 Virginia Polytechnic Institute and State University (a.k.a. Virginia Tech)
 Virtual path identifier, in computer networking 
 Verilog Procedural Interface, in computer programming
 Velopharyngeal insufficiency, a medical term
 Vertical Politics Institute, a conservative political action committee
 VPI Industries, a manufacturer of phonographs
 Vocational Preference Inventory
 Visegrad Patent Institute, a patent organization created by the four Visegrad countries
 VPIphotonics, photonic simulation tool